Podbielskiallee is an underground railway station in the German capital city of Berlin. It is part of the Berlin U-Bahn network and located in the Dahlem district on the  line.

History
The station opened on 12 October 1913 (architect was H.Schweitzer). The street was named after Prussian Minister of State Victor von Podbielski (1844–1916), son of General Eugen Anton Theophil von Podbielski.

It was destroyed in the Battle of Berlin.

The platform was roofed over in 1978, before only a part of it was under the roof. The U3 trains towards Krumme Lanke came above ground after Breitenbachplatz.

References

U3 (Berlin U-Bahn) stations
Railway stations in Germany opened in 1913
Buildings and structures in Steglitz-Zehlendorf